Peter Sprott Firstbrook (May 11, 1933 – February 22, 1985) was a Canadian figure skater. As a single skater, he was the 1951–1953  Canadian national champion. He placed 5th at the 1952 Winter Olympics. He was one of the few skaters to win the Canadian Junior and Senior titles in consecutive years.

Firstbrook also competed as a pair skater. With partner Mary Kenner, he was the 1947 Canadian junior bronze medalist.

In addition to single and pair skating, Firstbrook competed in the four skating discipline. With partners Mary Kenner, Vera Smith, and Peter Dunfield, he won the silver medal at the 1949 North American Figure Skating Championships. He died of pneumonia on February 22, 1985, in Guanajuato, Mexico, where he had been living in an artists' community.

Competitive highlights

Singles career

 J = Junior level

Pairs career
(with Mary Kenner)

Fours career
(with Mary Kenner, Vera Smith, and Peter Dunfield)

References

External links
 Profile
 
 

1933 births
1985 deaths
Canadian male single skaters
Canadian male pair skaters
Figure skaters at the 1952 Winter Olympics
Olympic figure skaters of Canada
Deaths from pneumonia in Mexico
20th-century Canadian people